Luigi Malcolm Hernandez (born 27 February 1993) is a Caymanian footballer who plays as a defender. He represented the Cayman Islands at the 2010 Caribbean Championship and in World Cup qualifying matches in 2011.

He was one of a group of Caymanian players identified by the country's football federation who they believed would benefit from playing overseas. He joined Ashford Town (Middlesex) in England after being invited over in late 2010 on an initial short term basis, although the move was extended then until the end of the season. He initially played for the club as a youth player but moved up to play for the first team, making twelve appearances.

In February 2012 he impressed visiting staff from Swindon Town and returned to England for further assessment by staff from the club. He then joined Evesham Town playing nine league games for the club.

References

Living people
1993 births
Caymanian footballers
Association football defenders
Cayman Islands international footballers
Evesham United F.C. players
Ashford Town (Middlesex) F.C. players
Bodden Town F.C. players
Caymanian expatriate footballers
Caymanian expatriate sportspeople in England
Expatriate footballers in England